The Ponta da Piedade Lighthouse is located at Ponta da Piedade in Lagos, in the Algarve region of Portugal. It started operations in mid-1913.

History
The lighthouse is a stone tower of masonry, 51 metres above sea level, with an attached keeper's house. It has a red flashlight. Despite plans having been made as early as 1883, it was not erected until 1912–13, on the site of the ruins of the "Nossa Senhora da Piedade" hermitage and a farmhouse that was bought from the owners. The delay was in part due to the opposition of the local parish council to the construction as it involved the destruction of the remains of the hermitage. Ponta da Piedade is now a well-known tourist location because of its rock formations, which can be visited by boats on hire close to the lighthouse.

Initially the lighthouse had a fourth-order Fresnel lens that emitted five flashes, grouped every ten seconds. The light source was an oil lamp and the range was 18 nautical miles. The 4th order lens was temporarily replaced during 1923 by a 6th order with a fixed white light. In 1952, the lighthouse was electrified with power from the public grid, and the oil lamp was replaced with an electric lamp, with an initial range of 15 nautical miles, subsequently increased to 18 nautical miles. Four years later, a new electric filament was mounted. It was automated in 1983, using a system supplied by the Gisman company, with one white light flash every seven seconds.

See also

 List of lighthouses in Portugal

References

External links
 
 

Lighthouses in Portugal
Lighthouses completed in 1913
1913 establishments in Portugal
Buildings and structures in Lagoa, Algarve